Johannes Aleidis (Johan) Ringers (2 January 1885 – 6 May 1965) was a Dutch politician.

Ringers was born in Alkmaar, and died in The Hague, aged 80.

1885 births
1965 deaths
Dutch civil engineers
Ministers of Housing and Spatial Planning of the Netherlands
People from Alkmaar
Delft University of Technology alumni
Nazi concentration camp survivors